The 1831 United Kingdom general election saw a landslide win by supporters of electoral reform, which was the major election issue. As a result, it was the last unreformed election, as the Parliament which resulted ensured the passage of the Reform Act 1832. Polling was held from 28 April to 1 June 1831. The Whigs won a majority of 136 over the Tories, which was as near to a landslide as the unreformed electoral system could deliver. As the Government obtained a dissolution of Parliament once the new electoral system had been enacted, the resulting Parliament was a short one and there was another election the following year. The election was the first since 1715 to see a victory by a party previously in minority.

Political situation
The ninth UK Parliament elected in 1830 lacked a stable Commons majority for the Tory government of the Duke of Wellington: the best estimate is that it there had 310 supporters, 225 opponents and 121 doubtful. After a series of defeats, on 15 November 1830 Henry Parnell's motion for an inquiry into the civil list was carried by 233 to 204; this defeat surprised Wellington and his cabinet and forced their resignation. Wellington went into opposition, with Sir Robert Peel as the Tory Leader of the Opposition in the Commons. A Whig government under Earl Grey was appointed on 22 November 1830, the first since the Ministry of all the Talents in 1806–07. The government's Leader of the House of Commons was Viscount Althorp, who also served as Chancellor of the Exchequer.

Grey was determined to bring in reform to the traditional electoral system, which had been discussed for many decades. With aristocratic colleagues he produced a surprisingly bold scheme of reform; the second reading of the Reform Bill was carried by only one vote (302–301) on 22 March 1831. The Tory opposition was determined to stop the scheme going ahead, and when the Bill went into committee on 18 April, General Gascoyne moved an amendment which required that the total number of MPs representing England and Wales ought not to be reduced. This proposal was a skilfully drafted 'wrecking amendment' and when it was passed by 299–291 on 19 April, the Grey government knew it would not get its legislation. In truth Grey had been ready to ask for a dissolution immediately the Committee stage began, and King William IV reluctantly agreed; the King dissolved Parliament in person (amid a great political tumult) on 22 April.

The new Parliament was summoned to meet on 14 June 1831, for a maximum seven-year term from that date.

Dates of election

At this period there was not one election day. After receiving a writ (a royal command) for the election to be held, the local returning officer fixed the election timetable for the particular constituency or constituencies he was concerned with. Polling in seats with contested elections could continue for many days.

The general election took place between the first contest on 28 April and the last contest on 1 June 1831.

Summary of the constituencies

Monmouthshire (1 County constituency with 2 MPs and one single member Borough constituency) is included in Wales in these tables. Sources for this period may include the county in England.

Table 1: Constituencies and MPs, by type and country

Table 2: Number of seats per constituency, by type and country

See also
 United Kingdom general elections
 List of MPs elected in the 1831 United Kingdom general election

References

Sources
 British Electoral Facts 1832–1999, compiled and edited by Colin Rallings and Michael Thrasher (Ashgate Publishing Ltd 2000). Source: Dates of Elections – Footnote to Table 5.02
 British Historical Facts 1760–1830, by Chris Cook and John Stevenson (The Macmillan Press 1980). Source: Types of constituencies – Great Britain
 His Majesty's Opposition 1714–1830, by Archibald S. Foord (Oxford University Press 1964)
 Parliamentary Election Results in Ireland 1801–1922, edited by B.M. Walker (Royal Irish Academy 1978). Source: Types of constituencies – Ireland

 
1831 elections in the United Kingdom
General election
1831
April 1831 events
May 1831 events
June 1831 events
1830s elections in Ireland